Geitner is a surname. Notable people with the surname include:
 Ernst August Geitner (1783–1852), German chemist, prominent in development of nickel silver
 Kurt von Geitner (1884-1968), German soldier and defendant at Nuremberg in Hostages Trial 
 Tim Geitner (Colorado politician)
 Thomas Geitner (born 1955), German-born journalist

See also
Timothy Geithner (born 1961), American economist and Secretary of the Treasury